Charles Chauncey Dwight House, also known as the Chase-Dwight House, is a historic home located at Auburn in Cayuga County, New York.  It was originally built in 1835, and expanded sometime after 1871 when it was purchased by Charles Chauncey Dwight, a State Supreme Court justice, residing in Auburn.  It is a -story, brick and frame dwelling in the Queen Anne style with faux timbering detailing, a limestone foundation, and a cross-gabled slate roof with dormers.  Also on the property is a contributing mid-19th century wood front gabled barn.

It was listed on the National Register of Historic Places in 2015.

References

External links

Houses on the National Register of Historic Places in New York (state)
Queen Anne architecture in New York (state)
Houses completed in 1871
Buildings and structures in Cayuga County, New York
National Register of Historic Places in Cayuga County, New York